The Irano-Afghan race or Iranid race is an obsolete racial classification of human beings based on a now-disproven theory of biological race. Some anthopologists of the 20th century classified the populations native to the Iranian plateau as belonging to this race, which was usually seen as a subrace of the Caucasian race or the Mediterranean racial subtype of that race, depending on the authority consulted.

Physiognomy
American anthropologist Carleton S. Coon described the Irano-Afghan race as a branch of the Mediterranean race, describing them as being long-faced, high-headed and leptorrhine (having long and narrow noses). By contrast, Swedish anthropologist Bertil Lundman postulates an "Iranid" subtype of his "Eastern Mediterranean" race. American anthropologist Earnest Hooton in 1946 describes the "Iranian Plateau type" as distinct from the Atlanto-Mediterranean one:

According to Italian anthropologist Renato Biasutti the type was defined by:

British anthropologist John Lawrence Angel, following Coon in 1971, discusses a "Nordic-Iranian type" in the following terms:

See also
Iranian peoples, a modern-day grouping of Indo-European peoples
Caspian race, term used by some racial anthropologists to describe a sub-group of the obsolete Caucasian race 
Arabid race

References

Historical definitions of race
Pseudoscience